Bondyug is a rural locality (a selo) and the administrative center of Bondyuzhskoye Rural Settlement, Cherdynsky District, Perm Krai, Russia. The population was 577 as of 2010. There are 7 streets.

Geography 
Bondyug is located 35 km west of Cherdyn (the district's administrative centre) by road. Rakina is the nearest rural locality.

References 

Rural localities in Cherdynsky District